Andrew Lyons (born 2 August 2000) is an Irish professional footballer who plays as a defender for Blackpool.

Club career

Youth career
A native of Naas, County Kildare, Lyons originally played with Dublin club St Joseph's Boys until July 2016 when he signed for League of Ireland club Bray Wanderers under-17 side, although a month later he signed for the under-17 side of Bohemians in August 2016. 2017, and 2018, saw Lyons help his side to back to back League of Ireland U19 Division wins, an Enda McGuill Cup win in 2018, while he also featured in the UEFA Youth League against Midtjylland in 2018 and PAOK in 2019. He was named League of Ireland U19 Division Player of the Year during his time with the club's under-19 team.

Bohemians
Lyons was an unused substitute in 3 league fixtures during the 2017 season. He made his debut in senior football on 5 June 2018 in a 3–1 defeat away to Dundalk in the Leinster Senior Cup.
Lyons scored the first goal of his senior career on 16 September 2019 in a 2–0 win over Crumlin United in the Quarter Final of the FAI Cup at Richmond Park. At the end of the 2020 season he was named in the PFAI Team of the Year by his fellow professionals. He signed a new one-year contract with the club on 25 January 2021.

Shamrock Rovers
Lyons signed a multi-year contract with rivals Shamrock Rovers on 24 January 2022. In doing so, he moved from a part-time contract with Bohemians to a full-time contract with Rovers. Lyons scored the first European goal of his career on 25 August 2022 in a 1–0 win over Hungarian side Ferencváros in a UEFA Europa League Playoff Round tie at Tallaght Stadium. On 6 September 2022, he was named League of Ireland Player of the Month for August 2022. Lyons was named the PFAI Players' Young Player of the Year for the 2022 season.

Blackpool
On 29 August 2022, it was announced that Lyons would join EFL Championship club Blackpool in January 2023 on a three-and-a-half-year deal for an fee believed to be in the region of £300,000 plus add-ons. He made his debut for the club on 7 January 2023, playing the full 90 minutes in a 4–1 win over Premier League side Nottingham Forest in the FA Cup. He scored his first goal for the club on 7 February 2023 in a 2–2 draw with Huddersfield Town at Bloomfield Road.

International career
Lyons has represented the Republic of Ireland at every level from under-15 up to under-21 level, including representing the under-19 side in the 2019 UEFA European Under-19 Championship in Armenia. He made his debut for the under-21 team in a friendly against Australia U23 on 2 June 2021.

Career statistics

Honours

Club
Shamrock Rovers
President of Ireland's Cup: 2022
League of Ireland Premier Division: 2022

Individual
PFAI Team of the Year: 2020
League of Ireland Player of the Month: August 2022
PFAI Players' Young Player of the Year: 2022

References

2000 births
Living people
Bohemian F.C. players
Shamrock Rovers F.C. players
Blackpool F.C. players
League of Ireland players
Republic of Ireland association footballers
Republic of Ireland youth international footballers
Republic of Ireland under-21 international footballers
Association football defenders
Association footballers from County Kildare
People from County Kildare
English Football League players
Bray Wanderers F.C. players